Sempervivum ciliosum, the Teneriffe houseleek, is a species of flowering plant in the stonecrop family Crassulaceae, native to Southeastern Europe. It forms spheres of pointed, succulent, hairy grey-green leaves. Despite a superficial resemblance, houseleeks are not closely related to cacti.

The Latin specific epithet ciliosum means “with a small fringe”. 

Sempervivum ciliosum has gained the Royal Horticultural Society’s Award of Garden Merit.

References 
 

ciliosum
Flora of Europe
Taxa named by William Grant Craib